The  is a Japanese literary award presented annually.  It was established in 1988 in memory of author Yukio Mishima. The Mishima Yukio Prize is explicitly intended for work that "breaks new ground for the future of literature," and prize winners tend to be more controversial and experimental than winners of the more traditional Akutagawa Prize. It is awarded in the same annual ceremony as the Yamamoto Shūgorō Prize, which was established by the same sponsor in 1988 to recognize popular writing and genre fiction.

Winners 
Shinchosha, the award's sponsor, maintains an official archive of award nominee and recipient information.

Members of the selection committee 
 From 1st to 4th: Kenzaburō Ōe, Jun Eto, Kenji Nakagami, Yasutaka Tsutsui, Teru Miyamoto
 From 5th to 8th: Shintaro Ishihara, Jun Eto, Genichiro Takahashi, Yasutaka Tsutsui, Teru Miyamoto
 From 9th to 12th: So Aono, Shitaro Ishihara, Jun Eto, Yasutaka Tsutsui, Teru Miyamoto
 From 13th to 20th: Masahiko Shimada, Nobuko Takagi, Yasutaka Tsutsui, Kazuya Fukuda, Teru Miyamoto
 From 21st to 24th: Yōko Ogawa, Hiromi Kawakami, Noboru Tsujihara, Keiichiro Hirano, Ko Machida
 Current members: Hiromi Kawakami, Kaoru Takamura, Noboru Tsujihara, Keiichiro Hirano, Ko Machida

Available in English translation

Nominees
 1988 (1st) - Banana Yoshimoto, Kitchen
 1994 (7th) - Rieko Matsuura, The Apprenticeship of Big Toe P (trans. Michael Emmerich, Kodansha USA, 2010)
 2003 (16th) - Novala Takemoto, Emily (trans. Misa Dikengil Lindberg, Shueisha English Edition, 2013)

Winners
 2003 (16th) - Otaro Maijo, Asura Girl (trans. Stephen Snyder, Haikasoru, 2014)

Notes

See also 
 List of Japanese literary awards

External links 
 Official Website 

Japanese literary awards
Yukio Mishima
Awards established in 1988
1988 establishments in Japan
Japanese-language literary awards